Sjøli is a Norwegian surname. Notable people with the surname include:

Hans Petter Sjøli (born 1974), Norwegian journalist and author
Knut Sjøli (1877–?), Norwegian politician
Sonja Irene Sjøli (born 1949), Norwegian politician

See also
Sjölin

Norwegian-language surnames